Haji Farah Ali Omar (1907unknown) was born in the town of jamaame, situated in the lower jubba region of Somalia, and was a Somali politician. He was a senior official in the government of the Trust Territory of Somalia and later served as Minister of Economic Affairs in Somalia's post-independence civilian administration.

Biography
Omar was born in 1907 in the town of Jamaame, situated in the Lower Juba region of Somalia. Hon. Haji Farah was born in Jamaame  in 1907 to parents from the middle region (Mudug). Farah spent his early years with his mother and after she died he lived with his father and stepmother briefly. After his mother's death, Farah failed to cope with his emotions and ran away from his father's home due to hostility from his stepmother. Farah started doing odd jobs in old town Mogadishu at the age of thirteen. He earned little but it was enough to pay for his studies. Farah succeeded in his studies and eventually he got a scholarship to Al-Azhar university in Cairo, Egypt, he is hailed from habargidir(sacad clan -indhoyar subclan. He later married his lifetime partner, Aisha Samatar. They had three daughters: Halima Farah, Fatima Farah and Dahabo Farah. Omar did not father any sons. His daughters followed his academic footsteps to become graduates from Al-Azhar University in Cairo.

Political career
Omar served as a Party Representative in the Territorial Council from 1952 to 1956. He was later appointed Minister for Economic Affairs in the Trust Territory of Somalia (1956) and the post-independence civilian government led by President Aden Abdullah Osman Daar. As a member of the government both before and after Somalia's independence, Omar was a member of various missions to the United States and to the United Nations.

References

1907 births
Year of death missing
Somali Youth League politicians
Government ministers of Somalia
Permanent Representatives of Somalia to the United Nations
Ethnic Somali people
Somalian diplomats